

The Frankfort CG-1 was a proposed Second World War American transport glider to be built for the United States Army, none were built and the programme was cancelled.

Design and development
When the Army Air Corps started a glider development program in 1941 it ordered two types of transport glider from the Frankfort Sailplane Company, a nine-seat and a 15-seat glider. The smaller glider was to carry a pilot and eight troops and the prototype was designated the XCG-1, the larger glider designated the XCG-2 was to have a pilot and co-pilot and carried 13 troops.

The company was busy with the production of the TG-1 training glider so the development of the two new types was slow but a static test XCG-1 was delivered to Wright Field in December 1941 for testing by the Army. The glider failed structural tests and the Army cancelled the contract for both the CG-1 and CG-2.

Variants
XCG-1
Prototype nine-seat transport glider, one non-flyable static test example only.
XCG-2
Prototype 15-seat transport glider, not built.

See also

References

Note

Bibliography
 

1940s United States military gliders
Glider aircraft